This is a list of the horse breeds usually considered to be wholly or partly of Ukrainian origin. Some may have complex or obscure histories, so inclusion here does not necessarily imply that a breed is predominantly or exclusively Ukrainian.

References 

 
Lists of Ukrainian domestic animal breeds